The 2023 Kentucky Wildcats football team will represent the University of Kentucky  in the Eastern Division of the Southeastern Conference (SEC) during the 2023 NCAA Division I FBS football season. The Wildcats are expected to be led by Mark Stoops in his 11th year as their head coach. 

The Kentucky football team plays its home games at Kroger Field in Lexington, Kentucky.

Schedule

References

Kentucky
Kentucky Wildcats football seasons
Kentucky Wildcats football